Bessemer Airport  is a city-owned public-use airport located three nautical miles (6 km) southeast of the central business district of Bessemer, a city in Jefferson County, Alabama, United States. According to the FAA's National Plan of Integrated Airport Systems for 2009–2013, it is categorized as a reliever airport for the Birmingham-Shuttlesworth International Airport.

Although many U.S. airports use the same three-letter location identifier for the FAA and IATA, this facility is assigned EKY by the FAA but has no designation from the IATA.

Facilities and aircraft 
It has one runway designated 5/23 with an asphalt surface measuring 6,007 by 100 feet (1,831 x 30 m). An instrument landing system was installed in 2000. A Civil Air Patrol squadron also operates from this airport.

For the 12-month period ending January 27, 2010, the airport had 102,600 general aviation aircraft operations, an average of 281 per day. At that time there were 99 aircraft based at this airport: 70% single-engine, 20% multi-engine, 7% jet and 3% helicopter.

References

External links 
 Bessemer Airport as an alternative to Birmingham International, Birmingham Business Journal, 3-Sep-2004
 Birmingham Executive Aviation, the fixed-base operator (FBO)
 Aerial image as of 6 March 1997 from USGS The National Map
 

Airports in Alabama
Bessemer, Alabama
Transportation buildings and structures in Jefferson County, Alabama